The National Museum of Roman Art (MNAR) is an archaeology museum located in Mérida, Spain. Devoted to Roman art, it exhibits extensive material from the archaeological ensemble of Mérida (the Roman colony of Augusta Emerita), one of the largest and most extensive archaeological sites in Spain, registered as UNESCO World Heritage Site in 1993.

History 
An archaeology museum in Mérida was created for the first time through a royal order issued on 26 March 1838. On the occasion of the two thousandth anniversary of the city's foundation, the museum was refounded as the National Museum of Roman Art in 1975. The current building is a work by Spanish architect Rafael Moneo. Building works started in 1981. The new premises were unveiled on 19 September 1986.

Gallery

References

External links
National Museum of Roman Art within Google Arts & Culture

Cultural tourism in Spain
National museums of Spain
Museums of ancient Rome in Spain
Museums in Extremadura
Museums established in 1838
1838 establishments in Spain